A. C. Clemons, Jr. (April 16, 1921 – October 19, 1992) was an American politician who served in the Louisiana Senate from 1960 to 1972. He originally was a Democrat but switched to Republican in 1970.

References

1921 births
1992 deaths
Louisiana state senators
20th-century American politicians